Los Lonely Boys: Cottonfields and Crossroads is a documentary feature film by independent filmmaker Hector Galán. The film had its world premiere at the SXSW Film and Music Festival in Austin, Texas in the United States, in 2006. It tells the story of the music group Los Lonely Boys from San Angelo, Texas.

Hector Galán started filming Los Lonely Boys in 2002 while the band was still performing in small venues in Austin and around Texas. The film tells the story of Los Lonely Boys from early childhood to the release of their album and their first Grammy win. The film focuses on Los Lonely Boys' cultural background, family, and musical influences. It follows their journey as they try to make it in the music industry. It also focuses on the Mexican American culture and history of San Angelo, Texas.

The film was also shown at the Los Angeles Latino International Film Festival (LALIFF) in 2006 and at the Turks & Caicos Film and Music Festival in October 2007. It had a limited theatrical run in 2006 and 2007. It was released on DVD in February 2007 by Xenon Pictures.

DVD track list
Opening
Cottonfields
Nashville Dreaming
Cantinas & Honky Tonks
Familia
Crossroads
San Angelo Show
Too Many Laters
The Rise of the Lonely Boys
Embarking on Tour
Homecoming
End Credits

External links

American documentary films
Documentary films about rock music and musicians
Los Lonely Boys video albums
2007 video albums
2007 live albums
Live video albums
2007 documentary films
Documentary films about Mexican Americans